The Syro-Malabar Catholic Eparchy of Gorakhpur is an Eastern Catholic eparchy in India, belonging to the Syro-Malabar Catholic Church. The eparchy was erected by Pope John Paul II in 1984 through the Bull "Ex quo Divinum Concilium". Thomas Thuruthimattam was appointed bishop of Gorakhpur on 15 July 2006. He received his episcopal consecration on 1 October 2006 and assumed office on the same day.

Former bishops
 Dominic Kokkatt

References

External links
 Syro-Malabar Catholic Diocese of Gorakhpur 
 Syro-Malabar Catholic Diocese of Gorakhpur at Catholic-Hierarchy

Syro-Malabar Catholic dioceses
Christian organizations established in 1984
Gorakhpur
1984 establishments in Uttar Pradesh
Christianity in Uttar Pradesh